Spencer Alexander (September 4, 1916 – November 29, 1987) was an American baseball left fielder in the Negro leagues. He played with the Newark Eagles in 1940 and 1941.

References

External links
 and Baseball-Reference Black Baseball Stats and  Seamheads

Newark Eagles players
1916 births
1987 deaths
Baseball players from North Carolina
Baseball outfielders
20th-century African-American sportspeople